Anwara Begum (died on 21 April 2018) was a Bangladeshi academic. She was the first ever female to serve as a vice-chancellor of a university in Bangladesh.  In 2006, she was awarded Ekushey Padak by the Government of Bangladesh for her contribution to education. She was married to the 14th President of Bangladesh, Iajuddin Ahmed, and served as the First Lady of Bangladesh from 2002 until 2009.

Career
Begum was a professor of the Department of Zoology at the University of Dhaka. She later served as the chairman of the Department of Zoology and the provost of the Shamsun Nahar Hall.

She was the first chairman of the board of trustees and the founding vice-chancellor of Atish Dipankar University of Science and Technology, a private university in Dhaka. She is the first women vice-chancellor for university in Bangladesh.

Personal life
Begum and her husband Iajuddin Ahmed had a son, Imtiaz Ahmed Babu.

References

1930s births
2018 deaths
Bangladeshi women academics
Academic staff of the University of Dhaka
Recipients of the Ekushey Padak
Date of birth missing
Place of birth missing
First Ladies of Bangladesh
Burials at Banani Graveyard
Vice-Chancellors of Atish Dipankar University of Science and Technology